Otto Pischinger (1919–1976) was an Austrian art director who designed the sets for a large number of films during his career. In 1955 he worked on The Last Ten Days. He was married to Hertha Hareiter, also an art director, until his death.

Selected filmography
 Duel with Death (1949)
 The Last Bridge (1954)
 A Heart Full of Music (1955)
 The Last Ten Days (1955)
 Royal Hunt in Ischl (1955)
 Music, Music and Only Music (1955)
 My Aunt, Your Aunt (1956)
 Emperor's Ball (1956)
 Final Accord (1960)
 The Turkish Cucumbers (1962)
 Snow White and the Seven Jugglers (1962)
 Old Shatterhand (1964)
 The Treasure of the Aztecs (1965)
The Pyramid of the Sun God (1965) 
 Call of the Forest (1965)
 Liselotte of the Palatinate (1966)

References

Bibliography
 Silberman, Marc. German Cinema: Texts in Context. Wayne State University Press, 1995.

External links

1919 births
1976 deaths
Austrian art directors
Film people from Vienna